Est 0.1 to 0.120 were 0-6-0 locomotives for mixed traffic of the Chemins de fer de l'Est.
They were retired from service from 1891 until 1928.

Construction history

The first series, Est 0.1–0.10, was built in 1848 by the Société l'Expansion à Mulhouse, following the design of the Stephenson 0-6-0 Mammouth locomotives.
The regulator was placed on the first boiler shell.
The cylinders, were inside of the frame in an inclined position, with a Stephenson valve gear.

The second series, Est 0.11–0.32, had only little differences and was put into service in 1850–1851.
The series Est 0.63–0.107 and 0.114–0.119 were built in 1853–1855 by Société J. F. Cail & Cie, and the series 0.108–0.112 as well as the 0.113 and the 0.120 were acquired from Parent & Schaken in 1860.

The locomotives were given the following names:

Service history
The locomotives were used for mixed service and over the years were assigned to most of the depots of the Chemins de fer de l'Est.
The first retirements occurred in 1891.
The last locomotive in service, the Est 0.42, was removed from service in 1928.

References

Bibliography

 

Steam locomotives of France
0.001
0-6-0 locomotives
Railway locomotives introduced in 1848
C n2 locomotives